The women's 100m freestyle events at the 2022 World Para Swimming Championships were held at the Penteada Olympic Swimming Complex in Madeira between 12 and 18 June.

Medalists

Results

S3

S4

Final
The final was held on 13 June 2022. 8 swimmers from 7 nations took part.

S5

S6
Heats
11 swimmers from 11 nations took part. The swimmers with the top eight times, regardless of heat, advanced to the final.

Final
The final was held on 13 June 2022.

S7

S8

S9

S10

S11

S12

S13

References

2022 World Para Swimming Championships
2022 in women's swimming